Yagyavalkya Institute of Technology is a technical college located in , Jaipur, India. 

Established in 2002, the college is affiliated with Rajasthan Technical University. The college offers B.Tech courses in civil engineering, mechanical engineering, electronics, electrical and communication, computer science and information technology. The first engineering student class started in 2003.

References

External links
 Yagyavalkya Institute of Technology

Universities and colleges in Jaipur